Fred (Frederick)  Wright (born 1947) is a British historian and theologian who has written extensively on the subject of the persecution of the Jewish people throughout history and is one of the few evangelical scholars to interface with the challenge of Theology after Auschwitz and subsequently propose a Theology of Catastrophe.  Later works concentrate on philosophical tensions within Jewish - Christian debate and ethical vectors relating to the dynamics of decision-making in the historical process.

His next title, Ethical Vectors in Warfare, is due to be published in 2019

The Cross became a Sword: The Soldiers of Christ and the First Crusade, in addition to dealing with the  historical events investigates both the character of the magnates in addition to their personal and group theologies.

Works

Book

Edited by
  - chapter(s) by Wright
  - chapter(s) by Wright

Footnotes

1947 births
Living people
British historians
Christian writers
Holocaust theology